Imazapic is a chemical used as an herbicide.  It controls many broad leaf weeds and controls or suppresses some grasses in pasture, rangeland and certain types of turf.  It has a half-life of around 120 days in soil. Impazic is considered an environmental hazard due to its harmful effects on aquatic life.

References 

Herbicides
Isopropyl compounds
Pyridines
Carboxylic acids